Sandro Key-Åberg (1922–1991) was a Swedish poet and novelist. He made his literary debut in 1950 with the poetry collection . He was awarded the Dobloug Prize in 1983 and the Illis quorum in 1987.

References

1922 births
1991 deaths
Dobloug Prize winners
20th-century Swedish novelists
20th-century Swedish male writers
Recipients of the Illis quorum